The Asian Tour 2014/2015 – Event 3 (also known as the 2015 Xuzhou Open) was a professional minor-ranking snooker tournament that took place between 20 and 24 January 2015 at the Xuzhou Olympic Center in Xuzhou, China.

Joe Perry won his second minor-ranking event by defeating Thepchaiya Un-Nooh 4–1 in the final. The Xuzhou Open was Un-Nooh's first professional final.

Prize fund 
The breakdown of prize money of the event is shown below:

Main draw

Main rounds

Top half

Section 1

Section 2

Section 3

Section 4

Bottom half

Section 5

Section 6

Section 7

Section 8

Finals

Century breaks 

 136, 113, 107  Thepchaiya Un-Nooh
 134, 130, 119  Zhou Yuelong
 120  Craig Steadman
 119, 119  Sean O'Sullivan
 119  Li Yujin
 110  Alfie Burden
 109  Noppon Saengkham
 108  Graeme Dott
 104  Mark Williams
 104  Joe Perry
 102  Fang Xiongman
 101  Luo Honghao

References 

AT3
2015 in Chinese sport
Snooker competitions in China